Brian Wiese is the head men's soccer coach at Georgetown. He has coached for two seasons at Georgetown. He also served as a top assistant coach at Stanford, and Notre Dame. While an assistant, those squads went a combined 136–48–25, including nine straight tournament appearances. From 1996 to 2001, he served as an assistant coach at Stanford, where the team posted a 71–21–12 record.

He graduated from Dartmouth College in 1995, where he earned a bachelor's degree in mechanical engineering.

References

External links
Georgetown Hoyas bio

1973 births
Living people
American soccer coaches
American soccer players
Association football goalkeepers
Dartmouth Big Green men's soccer players
Georgetown Hoyas men's soccer coaches
Notre Dame Fighting Irish men's soccer coaches
Place of birth missing (living people)
Stanford Cardinal men's soccer coaches